James Burdge Walton (1813–85) served for two decades in the famed New Orleans militia unit the Washington Artillery.  He was most prominent in the Confederate service in the American Civil War as commander of the Washington Artillery out of New Orleans and as Inspector-General of Field Artillery of the Confederate States, the highest position an artillery officer could achieve.

Early life
Born in New Jersey, Walton attended college in Louisiana and owned a New Orleans grocery store.

Military service

Mexican American War
Walton joined the Washington Artillery as an adjutant when the unit was formed in 1839. In the Mexican War, Walton commanded the 1st Louisiana Artillery as a Major and by 1857 he was Colonel Commanding of the battalion.

Civil War

At the outbreak of the Civil War, Walton and four of five batteries went East to serve in Virginia. After fighting at the First Battle of Manassas, Walton and his command were assigned to James Longstreet's forces. These batteries served in the Peninsula Campaign, at Second Manassas, and Antietam. Walton commanded the batteries on Marye's Heights during the Battle of Fredericksburg and the Chancellorsville Campaign. He commanded the artillery reserve of the First Corps artillery and was offended when at Gettysburg a subordinate Colonel E. Porter Alexander was placed in charge of the artillery preparation for Pickett's Charge on July 3, 1863. 

When the bulk of Longstreet's First Corps were sent to Georgia (United States), only a portion of the artillery was sent with it. Walton held several positions in southern Virginia during the absence of his guns. Walton worked to improve artillery formations and drills, it was during this time that he rose to the rank of Colonel after an act was passed through the congress of the Confederacy, making him the highest ranking artillery officer in the Confederacy. A prominent accomplishment of his was the design for the Hanging Tigers Head used as a badge by the Washington Artillery.  He resigned on July 18, 1864 and returned to his business as a merchant.

Family life

Walton's son, James B. Jr., was a student at Virginia Military Institute class of 1865 who resigned to join the Confederacy in 1861.

References

External links
 Col. JB Walton's Official Report Report of December 4, 1862
 Washington Artillery History

1813 births
1885 deaths
Confederate States Army officers
People of Louisiana in the American Civil War